Sedlnice is a municipality and village in Nový Jičín District in the Moravian-Silesian Region of the Czech Republic. It has about 1,700 inhabitants.

History
The first written mention of Sedlnice is from 1267.

References

Villages in Nový Jičín District